Omo‘a (or Omoa) is the name of a small town and valley at the head of a bay by the same name, on Fatu Hiva.

The bay of Omo‘a is the southernmost bay on the western coast of Fatu Hiva, and provides a good anchorage.  The village of Omo‘a was home to 247 inhabitants at the 2002 census.  The village is home to the island's only Protestant church.  The valley of Omo‘a is well-watered, and curves in a half-moon shape, first to the southeast, and then to the northeast, terminating at the island's central plateau.  This is where Thor Heyerdahl and his wife came ashore in 1937, an experience recorded in his book Fatu Hiva.

Populated places in the Marquesas Islands
Geography of the Marquesas Islands
Bays of the Pacific Ocean
Valleys of Oceania